Neidalia dognini is a moth of the family Erebidae first described by Walter Rothschild in 1909. It is found in French Guiana, Peru, Costa Rica and Hispaniola.

References

 

Phaegopterina
Moths described in 1909